Fifth Third Bank Stadium, known as Kennesaw State University Stadium until 2013, is a stadium near Kennesaw, Georgia, that is primarily used as the home for the Kennesaw State Owls football team as well as the KSU women's soccer and women's lacrosse teams. It was built as a soccer-specific stadium and opened May 2, 2010, with the first match played on May 9. The facility is the result of a public-private partnership between Kennesaw State University and the now-defunct Atlanta Beat of Women's Professional Soccer.

The stadium's seating capacity is 8,318. It has a stage at one end to facilitate concerts and can hold up to 16,316 for that purpose.

Stadium
The stadium will help showcase varsity athletics at KSU, which recently completed its transition into NCAA Division I.

The  on which the stadium sits is part of  acquired for the university by the KSU Foundation in 2008 and 2009, which now are being developed into athletics facilities for the university’s growing student population.

Football
In September 2010, KSU announced that it planned to launch a football program at the Division I FCS level in 2014, and would use the stadium as its home field. On February 14, KSU announced that the Board of Regents of the University System of Georgia approved the University’s request to add football to its 17-sport NCAA Division I intercollegiate athletics program.

On September 12, 2015, Kennesaw State played their first home football game at Fifth Third Bank Stadium with 9,506 in attendance, defeating the Edward Waters Tigers, 58-7.

Soccer
The facility was home to the Atlanta Beat in 2010 and 2011, and hosted the 2010 WPS All-Star Game on June 30. Pro soccer returned when Atlanta United 2 of the USL Championship moved to the stadium for the 2019 season. The stadium hosted a 2019 CONCACAF Champions League match where Atlanta United FC defeated C.S. Herediano 4–0 on February 28, 2019, and a U.S. Open Cup match between Atlanta United and Chattanooga FC on April 20, 2022, which Atlanta won 6–0. Atlanta United have won all eight of the matches the team has played at the stadium.

Rugby
The stadium hosted a round of the 2013–14 IRB Women's Sevens World Series on February 15–16, 2014.

The second half of a home-and-home series of rugby matches between the United States and Uruguay as part of the qualification for the 2015 Rugby World Cup in England, was played here on March 29, 2014. The United States won the match 32–13 to win the qualification spot on a two-match aggregate of 59–40.

The stadium hosted the United States when they played Georgia on June 17, 2017. The Eagles lost to Georgia 17–21.

USA Eagles Internationals
USA scores displayed first.

Renovation and renaming
Through a multimillion-dollar, multi-year sponsorship agreement with the Fifth Third Bank's Georgia regional office, KSU Stadium was renamed Fifth Third Bank Stadium with the addition of Division I football in February 2013. Campus facility plans in 2016 suggested expanding the stadium's capacity, but as of June 2018, Kennesaw State University had not funded the plan.

Attendance records

References
 List of NCAA Division I FCS football stadiums

Notes and references

External links
 New Soccer Stadium
 Stadium information from Atlanta Beat
 Football team announcement

College football venues
College lacrosse venues in the United States
College soccer venues in the United States
Atlanta Beat (WPS)
Kennesaw State Owls football
Major League Lacrosse venues
Premier Lacrosse League venues
Rugby union stadiums in the United States
USL Championship stadiums
Women's Professional Soccer stadiums
Lacrosse venues in the United States
American football venues in Georgia (U.S. state)
Soccer venues in Georgia (U.S. state)
Buildings and structures in Cobb County, Georgia
2010 establishments in Georgia (U.S. state)